The 2014 NCAA Division I Men's Lacrosse Championship was the 44th annual single-elimination tournament to determine the national championship for National Collegiate Athletic Association (NCAA) Division I men's college lacrosse. Eighteen teams competed in the tournament, selected by winning an automatic qualifying conference tournament or as an at-large bid based upon their performance during the regular season. The Divisions I men’s lacrosse committees announced the teams in the field on 4 May 2014.

Tournament overview

The tournament started on May 7, 2014 with two play-in games that were played on campus sites.  The winners of the games, Bryant and Air Force, advanced onto the first round of the tournament.  The tournament concluded with the championship game on May 29 at M&T Bank Stadium in Baltimore.

Schools from ten conferences, America East, ACC, Atlantic Sun, Big East, CAA, ECAC, Ivy League, MAAC, NEC, and Patriot League, earned automatic bids into the tournament by winning their respective conference tournaments, leaving eight remaining at-large bids for top ranked teams. Air Force (ECAC), Albany (America East), Bryant (NEC), Denver (Big East), Drexel (CAA), Loyola (Patriot), Notre Dame (ACC), Penn (Ivy), Richmond (Atlantic Sun), and Siena (MAAC), were the schools that claimed automatic bids.

In the finals, with Duke leading 8-2 in the third quarter, Notre Dame put together another comeback narrowing the margin to one with five minutes left in the game. Tewaaraton finalist Jordan Wolf closed out the title for Duke with an empty net goal with under a minute left. This was Duke's second straight title, their 3rd title in the prior five years, and their 8th straight final four appearance.

Teams

Bracket

 * = One Overtime

Tournament boxscores

Tournament Finals

Tournament Semi-Finals

Tournament Quarterfinals

Tournament First Round

All-Tournament
 Jordan Wolf, A, Duke (Most Outstanding Player)
 Henry Lobb, D, Duke
 Kyle Keenan, A, Duke
 Myles Jones, M, Duke
 Will Haus, M, Duke
 Deemer Class, A, Duke
 Sergio Perkovic, M, Notre Dame
 Conor Kelly, G, Notre Dame
 Matt Kavanagh, A, Notre Dame
 Wesley Berg, A, Denver

References

External links 
 Tournament statistics via NCAA

NCAA Division I Men's Lacrosse Championship
Sports competitions in Baltimore
NCAA Division I Men's Lacrosse Championship
NCAA Division I Men's Lacrosse Championship
NCAA Division I Men's Lacrosse Championship